"Ordinary Man" is a power ballad by English heavy metal musician Ozzy Osbourne featuring Elton John on piano and vocals. Besides John, it also features Slash on guitar, Duff McKagan on bass (both from Guns N' Roses), and Chad Smith of the Red Hot Chili Peppers on drums.

Produced with Andrew Watt, the rock ballad was released on 10 January 2020 as the third single from Osbourne's twelfth studio album of the same name. It won the 2021 Planet Rock Award for Best British Single.

Personnel
Ozzy Osbourne – vocals
Elton John – co-lead vocals, piano
Slash – guitar
Chad Smith – drums
Duff McKagan – bass

Charts

Weekly charts

Year-end charts

References

Ozzy Osbourne songs
Elton John songs
2020 songs
2020 singles
Epic Records singles
Rock ballads
Songs with music by Elton John
Songs written by Ozzy Osbourne
Songs written by Andrew Watt (record producer)
Songs written by Chad Smith
Songs written by Duff McKagan
Male vocal duets
Songs about musicians